The 2010 PBA All-Star Weekend was the annual all-star weekend of the Philippine Basketball Association (PBA)'s 2009–10 PBA season. The events were held from April 22 to 25, 2010 at the Puerto Princesa Coliseum, Puerto Princesa, Palawan. This was the first time that the PBA gave its hosting rights to the Province of Palawan.

Friday events

Obstacle Challenge
Time in seconds.

Three-point shootout

Slam Dunk competition

Failed to qualify: Gabe Norwood, JC Intal, and Rico Maierhofer

Rookie-Sophomore Blitz Game

Rosters

Rookies:
Rogemar Menor (Barako Bull)
Marvin Cruz (Coca-Cola)
Josh Urbiztondo (Sta. Lucia)
Chris Ross (Coca-Cola)
Ronnie Matias (Air21)
Chris Timberlake (Derby Ace)
Marcy Arellano (Rain or Shine)
Mike Burtscher (Alaska)
Coach:

Sophomores:
Beau Belga (Air21)
Mark Borboran (Alaska)
Jeffrei Chan (Rain or Shine)
Jared Dillinger (Talk 'N Text)
Kelvin Gregorio (Sta. Lucia)
Ryan Reyes (Sta. Lucia)
Larry Rodriguez (Coca-Cola)
Mark Yee (Talk 'N Text)
Coach: Luigi Trillo (Alaska)

Game

In the game, there were four 10-minute quarters, the 8-second rule was lessened into 6 seconds, the shot clock was cut into 18 seconds, and a slam dunk counted for three points.

Sunday events

Legends Shootout

All-Star Game

Rosters
The rosters for the All-Star Game were chosen in two ways. The starters were chosen via a fan ballot (online and at the venue during PBA games). Players are assigned to represent the North or South All-Star teams based from their place of birth. Players born in Luzon are assigned to the North All-Stars team while players born in Visayas and Mindanao are assigned to represent the South All-Stars. If the player is born outside the Philippines, the player is assigned to his parents' birthplace. Two guards and three frontcourt players who received the highest vote were named the All-Star starters. The reserves are voted by the ten PBA coaches after the results of the fan ballot are released.

North All-Stars:

Starters
Marc Pingris (B-Meg Derby Ace)
Gabe Norwood (Rain or Shine)
JC Intal (Brgy. Ginebra)
Paul Artadi (B-Meg Derby Ace)
Jayjay Helterbrand (Brgy. Ginebra)
Reserves
Mark Cardona (Talk 'N Text)
Ranidel de Ocampo (Talk 'N Text)
Rico Maierhofer (B-Meg Derby Ace)
Solomon Mercado (Rain or Shine)
Willie Miller (Brgy. Ginebra)
Ryan Reyes (Talk 'N Text)
Arwind Santos (San Miguel)
 Coach: Ryan Gregorio (B-Meg Derby Ace)

South All-Stars:

Starters
Asi Taulava (Coca-Cola)
Eric Menk (Brgy. Ginebra)
Kelly Williams (Talk 'N Text)
Cyrus Baguio (Alaska)
James Yap (B-Meg Derby Ace)
Reserves
Jimmy Alapag (Talk 'N Text)
Joe Devance (Alaska)
Dondon Hontiveros (San Miguel)
Reynel Hugnatan (Alaska)
Sonny Thoss (Alaska)
Ronald Tubid (Brgy. Ginebra)
Roger Yap (B-Meg Derby Ace)
Coach: Tim Cone (Alaska)

Game

See also
2009–10 PBA season

References

Philippine Basketball Association All-Star Weekend
All-Star Weekend
Sports in Palawan